SS Hispania was the name of a number of steamships.

, a ship which sank in the Sound of Mull on 18 December 1954
, a Willem H Müller ship launched as Empire Beaconsfield

See also
, a Swedish Lloyd ferry in service from 1969–72

Ship names